The R510 is a Regional Route in South Africa that connects Rustenburg with the Stockpoort Border with Botswana via Thabazimbi and Lephalale.

Route
It runs almost north-south for most of its length. The northern end of the R510 is the Stockpoort border post with Botswana. It runs east for 43 kilometres before giving off the R572 and assuming a southerly direction. It then continues to the town of Lephalale (Ellisras), where the R518 and the R33 both branch off, heading east. It continues south, giving off the R517 which head south-east, before reaching Thabazimbi. Just south of Thabazimbi, the R511 diverges and heads south. It then crosses into the North West, skirting the eastern border of the Pilanesberg National Park. The R566 crosses it, before it ends in the city of Rustenburg at an intersection with the R104 west of the city centre.

References

Regional Routes in Limpopo
Regional Routes in North West (South African province)